The Mauritanian National Olympic and Sports Committee  (IOC code: MTN) is the National Olympic Committee representing Mauritania.

See also
 Mauritania at the Olympics

References

Mauritania
Mauritania at the Olympics